The 2019–20 Northwestern State Lady Demons basketball team represents Northwestern State University during the 2019–20 NCAA Division I women's basketball season. The Demons, led by interim head coach Aaron Swinson, who took over for Jordan Dupuy following the latter's resignation on January 26, 2020, play their home games at Prather Coliseum and are members of the Southland Conference.

Previous season
The Lady Demons finished the season 11–18, 6–12 in Southland play to finish in eighth place. Due to a tie breaker loss to New Orleans they failed to qualify for the Southland women's tournament.

Roster
Sources:

Schedule
Sources:

|-
!colspan=9 style=| Non-conference regular season

|-
!colspan=9 style=| Southland Conference Schedule

|-
!colspan=9 style=| Non-conference regular season

|-
!colspan=9 style=| Southland Conference Schedule

See also
2019–20 Northwestern State Demons basketball team

References

Northwestern State
Northwestern State Lady Demons basketball seasons
Northwestern State
Northwestern State